Merin Joseph is an Indian Police Service (I.P.S.) officer. She currently appointed as the  Kollam city police commissioner, Kerala.

Personal life
She married Chris Abraham on 5 February 2015.

References

Indian Police Service officers
Kerala Police officers
Living people
1990 births